El árabe (English title: The Arab) is a Mexican telenovela produced by Valentín Pimstein for Televisa in 1980.

Cast 
Enrique Lizalde as Ahmed
Julieta Egurrola as Diana
Norma Lazareno as Zarda
Claudio Brook as Lord Saville
José Alonso as Ernesto Illinworth
Wally Barrón as Ibrahim Omar
Oscar Servín as Gastón
Chela Nájera
Guillermo Aguilar
Dina de Marco
Santanón
Eduardo Borja

References

External links 

Mexican telenovelas
1980 telenovelas
Televisa telenovelas
Spanish-language telenovelas
1980 Mexican television series debuts
1980 Mexican television series endings